Dirhinosia nitidula is a moth of the family Gelechiidae. It is found in Israel, Syria, Lebanon and Turkey.

The wingspan is 11–13 mm. The forewings have a yellowish ochreous sheen. There are two white fasciae and a longitudinal streak arising from the base. The hindwings are light greyish brown. Adults have been recorded on wing from May to June.

References

Moths described in 1867
Dirhinosia
Insects of Turkey